Captain Buckles is an album by saxophonist David "Fathead" Newman featuring performances recorded in 1970 and released on the Cotillion label.

Reception

AllMusic awarded the album 4 stars with its review by Scott Yanow calling it a "soulful but relatively straight-ahead effort" and "An improvement over David Newman's preceding projects".

Track listing
All compositions by David Newman except as indicated
 "Captain Buckles" - 4:36
 "Joel's Domain" - 4:15
 "Something" (George Harrison) - 3:40
 "Blue Caper" (Blue Mitchell) - 4:22
 "The Clincher" - 6:17
 "I Didn't Know What Time It Was" (Richard Rodgers, Lorenz Hart) - 5:04
 "Negus" - 5:15

Personnel 
David "Fathead" Newman - tenor saxophone, alto saxophone, flute
Blue Mitchell - trumpet
Eric Gale - electric guitar, acoustic guitar
Steve Novosel - bass 
Bernard Purdie - drums

References 

1971 albums
David "Fathead" Newman albums
Albums produced by Joel Dorn
Cotillion Records albums